Max Roach + 4 on the Chicago Scene is an album by the American jazz drummer Max Roach featuring tracks recorded in Chicago in 1958 and released on the EmArcy label in mono; alternate versions of four tracks were released in Japan on a 1984 stereo reissue.

Reception

Allmusic awarded the album 4 stars. In his review, Scott Yanow wrote, "This album might be brief (only around 31 minutes) but it has plenty of fine playing."

Track listing
 "Shirley" (George Coleman) - 6:42    
 "My Old Flame" (Sam Coslow, Arthur Johnston) - 3:41    
 "Sporty" (Bill Lee) - 5:53    
 "Stella by Starlight" (Ned Washington, Victor Young) - 4:23    
 "Stompin' at the Savoy" (Benny Goodman, Andy Razaf, Edgar Sampson, Chick Webb) - 2:55    
 "Memo: To Maurice" (Eddie Baker) - 7:47

Personnel 
Max Roach - drums
Booker Little - trumpet
George Coleman - tenor saxophone
Eddie Baker - piano 
Bob Cranshaw - upright bass

References 

1958 albums
Max Roach albums
EmArcy Records albums